Vadgaon  or Wadgaon  may refer to:

Places in Maharashtra, India
 Vadgaon Maval, a town in Pune district
Vadgaon railway station, a railway station serving above town
 Vadgaon Sheri, a neighbourhood in Pune
 Vadgaon Khurd, a neighbourhood in Pune
 Vadgaon Budruk, a neighbourhood in Pune
 Vadgaon Rasai, a village in Pune district
 Vadgaon Malegaon, a town in Nashik district
 Wadgaon Amali, a village in Ahmednagar district
 Wadgaon Darya, a village in Ahmednagar district
 Wadgaon Savtal, a village in Ahmednagar district
 Wadgaon, Pathardi, a village, List of villages in Pathardi taluka, in Ahmednagar district
 Wadgaon Pr Adgaon, a village in Buldhana district 
 Wadgaon Road, a town in Yavatmal district
 Peth Vadgaon, a town in Kolhapur district

Other
 Battle of Wadgaon (1779), a part of the first Anglo-Maratha war.